Zinc ricinoleate is the zinc salt of ricinoleic acid, a major fatty acid found in castor oil.  It is used in many deodorants as an odor-adsorbing agent. The mechanism of this activity is unclear.

Zinc carboxylates adopt the basic zinc acetate structure but they are often depict, like here, as salts with naked Zn2+ and two ionized carboxylate anions.

References

ricinoleate
Salts of carboxylic acids
Cosmetics chemicals